An arsenal is an establishment for the construction, repair, receipt, storage and/or issue of arms and ammunition.

Arsenal may also refer to:

Specific arsenals 
 Arsenal (Central Park), originally built for the New York State Militia
 , a military-industrial complex established south of the Bastille by Francis I
 Arsenal Library, the only surviving building of the complex
 Arsenal (Paris Métro), a former subway stop in that neighborhood
 Allegheny Arsenal, American Civil War-era arsenal in Pittsburgh
 Arsenal Academy, in a former arsenal, in Columbia, South Carolina
 Augusta Arsenal, 19th-century fortification in Augusta, Georgia
 Brest Arsenal, French shipbuilder
 Foochow Arsenal, Chinese naval shipyard
 Kyiv Arsenal in Kyiv, Ukraine
 Kremlin Arsenal, in Moscow
 Rock Island Arsenal, Rock Island, Illinois
 Royal Arsenal, Woolwich, London
 South Carolina State Arsenal, in Charleston, South Carolina
 Venetian Arsenal, "one of the earliest large-scale industrial enterprises in history"
 Warsaw Arsenal, the scene of heavy fighting during the Warsaw Insurrection of 1794
 Watertown Arsenal, major 19th century American arsenal in Watertown, Massachusetts, near Boston

Places named after arsenals 
 Arsenal (Paris Métro), a closed station on the Paris Métro
 Arsenal Center for the Arts in Watertown, Massachusetts
 Arsenal Hill (disambiguation), several places
 Arsenal Oak at Augusta State University, named for the Augusta Arsenal
 Arsenal Stadium in Highbury, London
 Arsenal Street (disambiguation), various places named or relating to an Arsenal Street
 Arsenal Technical High School, an Indianapolis, Indiana high school which was formerly a U.S. civil war arsenal
 Arsenal tube station, a station on the London Underground in Highbury, named after Arsenal FC
 Arsenal village, a village in Pamplemousses District
 Arsenalna (Kyiv Metro), a station on the Kyiv Metro
 Bibliothèque de l'Arsenal (Library of the Arsenal), in Paris
 Woolwich Arsenal station, a mainline train and DLR station in London, named after the Woolwich Arsenal
 Arsenal (Vienna), a former military complex of buildings

Art, entertainment, and media

Music
 Arsenal, the backing band in the Broadway musical Rock of Ages, since 2005
 Arsenal (American band), former indie rock band
 Arsenal (Belgian band), electronic music band
 Arsenal (jazz band), Russian jazz band, led by saxophonist Alexey Kozlov

Others
 Arsenal (Marvel Comics), Marvel Comics villain and antagonist of the Avengers
 Arsenal (1929 film), Soviet war film
 Arsenal (2017 film), American thriller film
 Arsenal/Surrealist Subversion, periodical published sporadically in Chicago
, Berlin, Germany
Kino Arsenal, cinema within the Institute
 Roy Harper (comics), DC Comics character known for a time as "Arsenal"

Companies
 Arsenal Cider House, small-batch cider manufacturer in Pittsburgh, named for the Allegheny Arsenal
 E-Arsenal or Arsenal, arms manufacturing company based in Tallinn, Estonia

Sports

Association football 
 Arsenal Atividades Desportivas Sport Club, from Santa Luzia, Brazil
 Arsenal Česká Lípa, from the city of Česká Lípa in northern Czech Republic
 Arsenal de Sarandí, from Sarandí, Argentina
 Arsenal FC (Lesotho), from Maseru, Lesotho
 Arsenal F.C. (Honduras), from Roatán, Honduras
 Arsenal F.C., football team from Highbury, London, England
 Arsenal Futebol Clube, from Sorriso, Brazil
 Arsenal W.F.C., the women's team of the London club
 Arsenal Wanderers, from Arsenal, Pamplemousses, Mauritius
 Berekum Arsenal, from Berekum, Ghana
 FC Arsenal Kharkiv, from Kharkiv, Ukraine
 FC Arsenal Kyiv, from Kyiv, Ukraine, dissolved in 2013
 FC Arsenal Tula, from Tula, Russia
 FC Arsenal-Kyivshchyna Bila Tserkva, from Bila Tserkva, Ukraine
 FK Arsenal Kragujevac, from Kragujevac, Serbia
 FK Arsenal Tivat, from Tivat, Montenegro
 S.C. Braga (nicknamed ), from Braga, Portugal
 SV Arsenal, from Nieuw Amsterdam, Suriname
 FC Arsenal Dzerzhinsk from Dzerzhinsk, Belarus

Basketball 
 Anaheim Arsenal, team in the NBA Development League

Transportation 
 Arsenal (car), car manufactured in the United Kingdom in the late 1890s
 Arsenal Crossley, Estonian armored car, manufactured in 1920s
 Arsenal de l'Aéronautique, French military aircraft manufacturer
 Arsenal VG-33, World War II French fighter aircraft

Weaponry
 Arsenal AD, Bulgarian arms manufacturer
 Arsenal Shipka, Bulgarian sub-machine gun
 Arsenal submachine gun, Estonian submachine gun